The Arkville station, MP 48.1 on the Ulster and Delaware Railroad (U&D), and MP 37.52 on the Delaware and Northern Railroad (D&N), was another busy station, as this served as a junction between the two railroads. This station bore a strong resemblance to the Grand Hotel station and the Pine Hill station, which both looked like longer versions of the Mount Pleasant station.

Ulster and Delaware
This station was built when the Rondout and Oswego Railroad got to Arkville (then called Dean's Corners) in 1871, covering the site of the ancient Tuscarora Indian headquarters.  In addition to the station the U&D also constructed a freight house, engine house, water tower, coaling tower and turntable here.  Helper engines were added to eastbound trains here to help on the steep grade to the summit at Grand Hotel station. 

Major shippers here included the Luzerene Chemical Company and Callanan Industries.  In the late 19th century and early 20th century, Luzerne operated a large wood acid factory located on the flats west of the U&D and north of the D&N.  This factory was served by a long siding running south from the U&D.  Calanan received large quantities of material used in highway construction up through the 1970s, processing them in a plant located on the flat south of the present Arkville yard.
In the town of Arkville, there were several churches, stores, hotels, and even a local waterworks. This station survived until the end of passenger service on the U&D, on March 31, 1954, when the station was abandoned and left to deteriorate. It was hit by a runaway milk truck in the 1960s, and was so badly damaged that it was torn down for fear someone would get hurt. Now, the freight half of the Halcottsville Railroad Station and a group of benches are in its place. The U&D's Arkville freight house is now the Arkville station for the Delaware and Ulster Railroad.

Delaware and Northern
Arkville was the eastern terminus of the Delaware and Northern.  The D&N track ended at the switch just east of the Route 28 highway crossing, but its trains were allowed to enter the yard and use the turntable.  West of New York State Route 28 the D&N had its own freight house, which still stands today as a laundromat, a pizza parlor and an apartment complex. The D&N ran this freight house and did business at the Arkville station until it went bankrupt in 1942. Its equipment was sold for scrap and the railroad was torn up, making way for the new Pepacton Reservoir, which submerged over ⅔  of its right-of-way. The New York Central acquired the portion of the D&N running past the D&N's old freight house and served a retail coal dealer located there until the line was abandoned, on October 3, 1976.

References

External links
 Delaware and Ulster Railroad

Railway stations in the Catskill Mountains
Railway stations in Delaware County, New York
Former Ulster and Delaware Railroad stations
Former railway stations in New York (state)
Railway stations closed in 1954